In enzymology, a cycloartenol synthase is an enzyme that catalyzes the chemical reaction

(S)-2,3-epoxysqualene  cycloartenol

Hence, this enzyme has one substrate, (S)-2,3-epoxysqualene, and one product, cycloartenol.

This enzyme belongs to the family of isomerases, specifically those intramolecular transferases transferring other groups.  The systematic name of this enzyme class is (S)-2,3-epoxysqualene mutase (cyclizing, cycloartenol-forming). Other names in common use include 2,3-epoxysqualene cycloartenol-cyclase, squalene-2,3-epoxide-cycloartenol cyclase, 2,3-epoxysqualene cycloartenol-cyclase, 2,3-epoxysqualene-cycloartenol cyclase, and 2,3-oxidosqualene-cycloartenol cyclase.  This enzyme participates in biosynthesis of steroids.

References

 

EC 5.4.99
Enzymes of unknown structure